Sally Fox (or Sallie Fox) may refer to:

 Sallie Fox (1845–1913), California pioneer
 Sally Fox (politician) (1951–2014), American lawyer and politician
 Sally Fox (inventor) (born 1959), American inventor
 Sally Fox (photographer) (1929–2006), American photographer and book editor